The Plaxton Elite is a coach body unveiled at the Euro Bus Expo at the National Exhibition Centre, Birmingham in November 2008 by the British bus and coach manufacturer Plaxton. It is primarily targeted at the premium touring market. It went into production in late 2008. The vehicles can easily be identified due to their Boeing 747-like curved roof at the front end. Elites on scheduled express routes have a low-level destination board, resulting in a larger front windscreen than most comparable coaches.

Scheduled Express Services 

The type began service with National Express in early 2010 with seven operating between London and Liverpool. A further 16 vehicles are being procured to operate in Yorkshire, Oxford and Peterborough. In Yorkshire, Elites have replaced Caetano Levantes on the long distance 560 service to London, with the latter having been assigned to the 007 and 022 routes between London and Kent. Onboard features on National Express vehicles include power plug sockets. Elites also have wheelchair lifts installed in their doorways, making them only the second type operated by National Express to be completely wheelchair friendly. National Express Elites have destination displays positioned below the windscreen, in order to avoid obscuring the passengers' forward vision. A batch of 15m B13RT entered service with National Express in 2014. 14m Elites entered service on the Oxford-Cambridge X5 in 2015

The 100th Elite was delivered to Howard Snaith Coaches in 2011 built on the Volvo B9R chassis.

Elite i 
In 2012, Plaxton introduced a new "interdeck" version of the Elite, named Elite i, in which the passenger cabin extends above the driver's cab to span the full length of the vehicle; in addition there is a small lower saloon. The Elite i is 15 m long and 3.96 m high, and is built on Volvo B11RT chassis. The first batch of eleven went to Stagecoach West Scotland for Megabus services in December 2012.

See also 

 List of buses

References

External links

Plaxton Elite
National Express news article

Elite